Ewen Leslie (born 27 July 1980) is an Australian stage, film and television actor.

Career

Theatre
His first work on Sydney stages was performing at the Old Fitzroy Hotel theatre in Woolloomooloo. In 2007 he was cast by Philip Seymour Hoffman in Riflemind, a play by Andrew Upton which premiered at the Sydney Theatre Company.

He joined the STC Actors Company in 2008 and won a Helpmann Award and a Sydney Theatre Award for his performance as Prince Hal/Henry V opposite Cate Blanchett in The War of the Roses (directed by Benedict Andrews).

In 2010 he played Richard III at the Melbourne Theatre Company directed by Simon Philips. Alison Croggon in The Australian wrote: "This is a deeply intelligent performance, physically and emotionally unafraid. It marks the ascension of a remarkable actor". He won his second Helpmann Award and a Green Room Award for this performance.

The following year he played Hamlet in a sellout season at the Melbourne Theatre Company (a role he would reprise in 2013 in Sydney for Belvoir St Theatre). He played one of the lead roles in The Wild Duck (directed by Simon Stone) which had successful seasons in Sydney, Melbourne and Oslo for The Ibsen Festival.

In 2013 he was The Player in STC's Rosencrantz and Guildenstern are Dead opposite Toby Schmitz and Tim Minchin. In 2015 he travelled to Paris to perform in Simon Stone's production of Thyestes, and played the title role in Belvoir's production of Ivanov.

In 2021 he returned to the Sydney Theatre Company to perform in Kip Williams production of Julius Caesar performed by only three actors.

Film and television
His first break came when he was cast as the lead role in Jewboy, a film that screened at the Cannes Film Festival and Sundance Film Festival. He has played lead roles in Three Blind Mice, Dead Europe, The Butterfly Tree and The Daughter. He has also appeared in Kokoda, The Railway Man, Sleeping Beauty, The Mule, Sweet Country and The Nightingale.

Notable roles on TV include Operation Buffalo, The Luminaries, The Gloaming, The Cry, Safe Harbour, Fighting Season, Deadline Gallipoli, Devil's Dust, Mabo, Redfern Now and Rake.

In 2017 he won an AACTA Award for his role as Pyke in the second season of Top of the Lake opposite Elisabeth Moss, Nicole Kidman and Alice Englert. Maureen Ryan in Variety wrote that his performance was "subtle and powerful", while Michael Idato in the Sydney Morning Herald wrote, "In a world where fame is fleeting and often hoisted upon the undeserved, Leslie is a proper revelation. He's a stunning performer, perhaps one of the best on our screens".

He also voices the character of Pigling Bland in the Peter Rabbit films.

Filmography

Film

Television

Theatre credits

Awards and nominations

References

External links
 

1980 births
Living people
AACTA Award winners
Australian male film actors
Australian male stage actors
Australian male television actors
Australian child actors
Australian male child actors
Helpmann Award winners